Jean Hermil (September 24, 1917 in Charolles – March 10, 2006 in Viviers) was Roman Catholic bishop of Viviers, France.

He was ordained a priest on July 5, 1942 at Autun. He was appointed auxiliary bishop there on May 15, 1963, and simultaneously appointed titular bishop of Marida, with formal ordination on July 2 – being the last holder of that office. On December 14, 1965, he was appointed bishop of Viviers, a position he held until retirement on October 15, 1992.

References

External links
Catholic Hierarchy 

1917 births
2006 deaths
Participants in the Second Vatican Council
20th-century Roman Catholic bishops in France
Bishops of Viviers